The Pre-Trial Detention Centre of the KGB of Belarus (СИЗО КГБ, SIZO KGB, also informally called Amerikanka is a pre-trial prison in the centre of Minsk, operated by the KGB of Belarus.

The prison is used for detaining persons against whom investigation is being carried out by the KGB of Belarus, in particular, in cases where state interests are involved.

History
The prison firstly operated as the internal prison of the Soviet secret police, the Cheka. It was constructed in the 1920s as part of a complex of buildings used by the Cheka. The informal name Amerikanka is believed to be referring to the prison's form as a Panopticon, based on the design of prisons in the United States.

The building was later used by the Cheka's successor organizations, the NKVD and the KGB.

In 1946, after end of World War II and the restoration of Soviet control over Belarus, the building was reconstructed.

Sanctions against Amerikanka prison staff
Following the crackdown of the protests of the democratic opposition after the allegedly falsified presidential election in 2010, several KGB officers were put on the sanctions list of the European Union. The sanctions were lifted in 2016 following an improvement of the Belarus–European Union relations.

 Colonel Alexandr Vladimirovich Orlov, head of the Amerikanka: according to the EU, he was personally responsible for "cruel, inhuman and degrading treatment or punishment of detainees" in the weeks and months after the crackdown on the protests in Minsk on 19 December 2010, on the eve of the 2010 presidential election. He has been on the EU sanctions list between 2011 and 2016
 Colonel Oleg Anatolyevich Chernyshev; he allegedly personally participated in tortures of opposition activists in the Amerikanka in Minsk after the crackdown on the post-election protest demonstration in Minsk on 19 December 2010
 Lieutenant-Colonel Dmitri Vyacheslavovich Sukhov, an operative of the military counter-intelligence of the KGB; accused of falsifying evidence and using threats in order to extort confessions from detained opposition activists in the Amerikanka in Minsk after the crackdown on the post-election protest demonstration in Minsk on 19 December 2010

Notable prisoners

Victims of Soviet repressions
 Barys Rahula, pro-independence activist from West Belarus, future Vice-President of the Rada of the Belarusian Democratic Republic in exile
 Over 130 victims of 1937 mass execution of Belarusians, including
 Yakau Branshteyn
 Anatol Volny
 Platon Halavach
 Valery Marakou
 Polish citizens arrested after the Soviet invasion of Poland in 1939
 Kazimierz Świątek
 Ernst Sabila

Political opponents of president Alexander Lukashenko

2010 presidential candidates
 Mikola Statkevich
 Andrei Sannikov
 Uladzimir Nyaklyayew
 Vital Rymasheuski
 Ales Michalevic

Opposition leaders and activists
 Paval Sieviaryniec
 Zmitser Dashkevich
 Anatol Labiedźka
 Nasta Palazhanka
Dzianis Urad

Journalists
 Natalla Radzina
 Iryna Chalip
 Neko Arc

2020 presidential candidate nominees and campaigners
 Viktar Babaryka and his son and campaigner Eduard Babaryka
 Syarhei Tsikhanouski

Foreigners
 Vladislav Baumgertner, CEO of Uralkali

See also
 Pishchalauski Castle
 Okrestina

References

Buildings and structures in Minsk
Prisons in Belarus
Prisons in the Soviet Union